Bani-ye Shib (also Romanized as Bānī-ye Shīb; also known as Bān-e Shīb) is a village in Sarbuk Rural District, Sarbuk District, Qasr-e Qand County, Sistan and Baluchestan Province, Iran. At the 2006 census, its population was 641, in 114 families.

References 

Populated places in Qasr-e Qand County